The Santa Barbara Mission Archive-Library was founded in 1967 as an independent, non-profit educational and research institution. The collection of mission documents in the archive-library remain in situ from the founding of the mission system. The collections include named sections, the Junipero Serra Collection (1713-1947), the California Mission Documents (1640-1853), and the Apostolic College collection (1853-1885). The archive-library also has a large collection of early California writings, maps, and images as well as a collection of materials for the Tohono O'odham Indians of Arizona.  The institution holds several thousand photo images of various types covering a broad range of subjects and dating back to the late nineteenth century.  Their collections also contain nineteenth-century oil paintings of the California missions by Edwin Deakin

SBMAL is the archival repository for registers in which the sacraments of baptism, marriage, and burial were recorded at the California missions.  There are mission records from Mission San Diego de Alcalá; Mission San Carlos Borromeo de Carmelo; Mission San Antonio de Padua; Mission San Gabriel Arcángel; Mission San Luis Obispo de Tolosa; Mission San Francisco de Asís (Dolores); Mission San Juan Capistrano; Mission Santa Clara de Asís; Mission San Buenaventura; Mission Santa Bárbara (including Mission, Presidio, and Our Lady of Sorrows); Mission La Purísima Concepción; Mission Santa Cruz; Mission Nuestra Señora de la Soledad; Mission San Juan Bautista; Mission San Miguel Arcángel; Mission San Fernando Rey de España; Mission San Luis Rey de Francia; Mission Santa Inés; Mission San Rafael Arcángel; Mission San Francisco de Solano; Plaza—Los Angeles

History

The current archive-library, associated with but not part of the Franciscan Mission Santa Barbara, is a secular institution with an academically-trained, lay director.  However, the original collection and organization is from the founding of the mission system in Alta California by the Franciscan Order. Santa Barbara became the headquarters of the California mission system, and documents relating to other California missions were collected and stored in Santa Barbara.  The mission system was founded during period that Spanish Empire claimed California. With Mexican independence in 1821, religious jurisdiction remained in Franciscan hands, but the Mexican government in the early 1830s secularized the missions, turning them into parish churches.  The collection of books and documents held by the Franciscan totaled around 3000 documents and around 1,000 books.

The materials held by the Franciscans was increased by Fr. Zephyrin Engelhardt, who conducted research on the Franciscan missions in California. He took extensive notes in the California archive in the office of the Surveyor General in San Francisco.  Those notes are invaluable, since that office was destroyed in the San Francisco earthquake of 1906.

The physical condition of the collection deteriorated, due to dampness in the storage area and mold. In order to prevent further damage, a new facility to house the collection was envisioned. Creating a non-profit corporation, separate from Mission Santa Barbara was accomplished in 1967.  For a period, it was headed in succession by Franciscans Geiger, Francis Guest, and Virgilio Biasiol, who initiated steps to better preserve the collection. Following the death Biasiol, the Archive-Library hired a lay professional archivist, Lynn Bremer. The second and current lay professional historian and archivist is Dr. Mónica Orozco.

Primarily a research facility, the Archive-Library also hosts talks by scholars. Its collection is listed in a finding aid at the Library of Congress.

It has been featured in a segment on C-SPAN, with SBMAL Director Orozco highlighting aspects of the collection.

References

External links

C-SPAN documentary on the Santa Barbara Mission and Mission Archive-Library
Cres Olmstead, "History of the Santa Barbara Mission Archive Library, California Missions Foundation
Matt Kettman, "The Mission Archive Library." Santa Barbara Independent 15 May 2014
Matt Kettman, "Mission Life not Black and White." Santa Barbara Independent 24 November 2011
Santa Barbara Mission Archive Library, Library of Congress, Hispanic Division finding aid.
Charles Hillinger, "Santa Barbara Mission: A Treasure-Trove of History" Los Angeles Times, 29 December 1991
Scott M. Haskins, "Paintings of the 21 Old Spanish Missions of California by Edwin Deakin - their story and conservation." International Institute of Conservation of Historic and Artistic Works

Santa Barbara, California
Archives in the United States
Buildings and structures in Santa Barbara, California
Libraries in California
Former private collections in the United States
Rare book libraries in the United States
Research libraries in the United States
Special collections libraries in the United States
Libraries established in 1967
1967 establishments in California
Spanish missions in California
Spanish-American culture in California
Latin American studies
1786 in Alta California
History museums in California
Museums in Santa Barbara, California
1786 establishments in Alta California
History of Santa Barbara County, California
Spanish Colonial architecture in California
Historic preservation organizations in the United States